Vaskareh (also Romanized as Vaskāreh and Vesgāreh; also known as Vesgāh) is a village in Abali Rural District, Rudehen District, Damavand County, Tehran Province, Iran. At the 2006 census, its population was 75 in 24 families.

References 

Populated places in Damavand County